Kim In-sung (Hanja: 金寅成; born 9 September 1989) is a South Korean footballer who currently plays for Pohang Steelers.

He graduated from Sungkyunkwan University and formerly played for Russian Premier League side PFC CSKA Moscow.

Career statistics

Honours

Club 
CSKA Moscow
 Russian Cup : 2012–13

Jeonbuk Hyundai Motors:
 K League 1 : 2014

Ulsan Hyundai:
 Korean FA Cup : 2017
 AFC Champions League : 2020

International
South Korea
 EAFF E-1 Football Championship : 2019

References

External links
 National League Profile
 

1989 births
Living people
South Korean footballers
South Korean expatriate footballers
Gangneung City FC players
PFC CSKA Moscow players
Seongnam FC players
Jeonbuk Hyundai Motors players
Incheon United FC players
Ulsan Hyundai FC players
Seoul E-Land FC players
Pohang Steelers players
Korea National League players
Russian Premier League players
K League 1 players
K League 2 players
Expatriate footballers in Russia
South Korean expatriate sportspeople in Russia
Sungkyunkwan University alumni
Association football midfielders